The Office of Educational Technology is located in the Office of the Secretary of the United States Department of Education. OET develops national educational technology policy and advocates for the transition from print-based to digital learning and supports the President's and Secretary’s educational priorities.

The Office of Educational Technology was established in 1994 as part of the Goals 2000 Educate America Act.

The first director of the Office of Educational Technology was Linda Roberts.

Key Initiatives of OET
 Supporting personalized learning models
 ConnectEd_Initiative (connecting US schools to broadband)
 Creating Education Innovation Clusters

Notable OET Publications
 Enhancing Teaching and Learning through Educational Data Mining and Learning Analytics
 Expanding Evidence Approaches for Learning in a Digital World
 Learning With Connected and Inspired Educators
 Promoting Grit, Tenacity, and Perseverance—Critical Factors for Success in the 21st Century

Former OET Directors
The Office of Education Technology has had seven directors in its duration.
 Linda Roberts
 Susan Patrick
 John Bailey
 Tim Magner
 Karen Cator
 Richard Culatta
 Joseph South
 Chris Rush

References

United States Department of Education
Governmental educational technology organizations